WMFX (102.3 MHz) is a commercial FM radio station licensed to St. Andrews, South Carolina, and serving the Columbia metropolitan area. The Alpha Media outlet broadcasts a classic rock radio format, with a few alternative rock artists also in the playlist.  The station goes by the name Fox 102.3 and its current slogan is "Columbia's Rock Station."  Its radio studios and offices are located on Pineview Drive in Columbia.

WMFX has an effective radiated power (ERP) of 6,000 watts.  Its transmitter is on Winterwood Road near Monticello Road.

History
On January 23, 1985, the station first signed on as WWGO.  It played a mix of Oldies and Adult Contemporary music under the "Go 102" handle. This format finished in the top five the first rating period with disc jockey John Anderson hosting mornings.  It was sold in early 1987 after its second rating period saw a drop.

New owners changed the format to album rock, with a lean musically toward classic rock.  The new call sign was WMFX, using the moniker Fox 102. The changes paid off as the station was usually placed within the Top 5 of the Arbitron ratings since that time.

In 1994, the station adjusted its format further toward classic rock and added the syndicated John Boy and Billy show for mornings.

The station is owned by Alpha Media through Alpha Media Licensee LLC, which also owns Urban Contemporary WHXT, Urban AC WWDM, and Hot AC WARQ in the Columbia radio market.

In March 2014, WMFX changed to mainstream rock, retaining the classic rock songs while adding alternative rock selections, from mostly 1990s artists such as Nirvana, Smashing Pumpkins, and The Foo Fighters. 2000's Groups such as Nickelback, Staind, Hoobastank and Trapt are also heard on WMFX.

References

External links
Fox 102.3's website

Classic rock radio stations in the United States
MFX
Alpha Media radio stations